Giant Cycling Team is a Chinese UCI Continental cycling team established in 2009.

Team roster

Major wins
2011
Stage 3 Tour de Korea, Xu Gang
2012
Overall Tour of Vietnam, Huang En
2013
Stage 3 Tour de Korea, Liu Hao
2014
 National Time Trial championships, Nan Wu
2015
 National Time Trial championships, Nan Wu
2019
 National Time Trial championships, Shi Hang

References

External links

UCI Continental Teams (Asia)
Cycling teams established in 2009
Cycling teams based in China
2009 establishments in China